Great Thrift Wood is a  biological Site of Special Scientific Interest in Cox Green in Berkshire. The site is a broadleaved, mixed and yew woodland located in a lowland area. The wood was classed in 1984 as a Site of Special Scientific Interest.

Flora

The site has the following Flora:

Trees

Birch
Fraxinus
Salix cinerea
Quercus robur
Hazel
Alder
Salix fragilis
Frangula alnus
Acer campestre
Populus tremula
Sorbus torminalis

Plants

Rubus fruticosus
Circaea lutetiana
Anemone nemorosa
Orchis mascula
Lysimachia nemorum
Ranunculus auricomus
Carex acutiformis
Iris pseudacorus
Valeriana officinalis
Lychnis flos-cuculi
Mentha aquatica
Festuca gigantea
Agropyron caninum

References

Sites of Special Scientific Interest in Berkshire